Mohamed Naveed Nawaz (born 20 September 1973), is a former Sri Lankan cricketer. He was a left-handed batsman and a leg-break bowler who played one Test and 3 One-Day Internationals for Sri Lanka.  He is appointed as under-19 coach of Bangladesh. Under the coaching of Nawaz, in The 2020 ICC Under-19 Cricket World Cup Bangladesh beat India by three wickets to win the tournament.

School times
During his school days for D.S. Senanayake College, Colombo he won the Sri Lanka's School Boy Cricketer of the Year in 1993.

Domestic career
For his long term club sides Bloomfield and later NCC, he plied his trade for many years as a regular number 3 batsman playing alongside Sri Lankan names like Sanath Jayasuriya, Aravinda De Silva, Hashan Tillekaratne and Kumar Sangakkara. His first class average was 40 and he got an opportunity to showcase this in 2002 almost 5 years after his first international ODI appearance and many years after his first ever international tour with Arjuna Rantunga's side to the Caribbean as a benchwarmer.  Despite this he came out of that one Test match with a test average of 99 which remains his average to this day as he was once again shelved. He made his Twenty20 debut on 17 August 2004, for Nondescripts Cricket Club in the 2004 SLC Twenty20 Tournament.

International career
Nawaz has played only one Test, against Bangladesh. He had played for his club side for several years before an international appearance had been forthcoming, his first and only international match taking place in July 2002, and in 2004 Nawaz ventured into Twenty-20 cricket.

In 2004, he was appointed as the captain of Sri Lanka A side toured New Zealand and the team included very good players likes of Lasith Malinga.

After cricket
Naveed Nawaz retired from International and domestic cricket in 2005 and ventured into the field of coaching first-class cricket in Sri Lanka.  He was player-cum-coach of Nondescript cricket club, head coach of Moors Sports club and he has done a good job  as the head coach with one of Sri Lanka's cricket clubs; the Sinhalese Sports Club. His latest contract is as an assistant head coach of Sri Lanka National team for 2 years from 2022,  He is now visiting Bangladesh with the team of Sri Lanka in the Bangladesh-Sri Lanka Test series 2022.

In 2007/08 Naveed Nawaz was head coach of the Fingara International cricket academy (FICA), an academy that is owned by a privately held company in Sri Lanka.

In 2009, Naveed Nawaz was appointed as consultant coach for the Sri Lanka women's team and accompanied them in the Women's world cup in Australia and t-20 cup in England.

In 2009, Sri Lanka Cricket (SLC) appointed Naveed Nawaz the Head coach of the Sri Lanka National under-19 team.

Bangladesh under-19 Cricket 
in 2018, 16 July, Nawaz was appointed as under-19 coach of Bangladesh. Bangladesh Youth's ended as Runners up in the 2019 ACC Asia under 19 tournament which was held in Sri Lanka under his purview. During the tournament Bangladesh u19 team was able to beat hosts to ended as table toppers of group A.
Under the coaching of Nawaz, in The 2020 ICC Under-19 Cricket World Cup Bangladesh beat India by three wickets to win the tournament. It was the Bangladesh' men's first finals win in an ICC event at any level.

Sri Lanka 
On 17 April 2022, he was appointed as assistant coach for Sri Lanka national cricket team for two years.

References

1973 births
Living people
Sri Lanka One Day International cricketers
Sri Lanka Test cricketers
Sri Lankan cricketers
Nondescripts Cricket Club cricketers
Uva cricketers
Sri Lankan cricket coaches